Les Millions d'Arlequin (English: Harlequin's Millions) (Russian: "Миллионы Арлекина", Milliony Arlekina) also known under the title Harlequinade (Russian: "Арлекинада", Arlekinada) is a ballet comique in two acts and two tableaux with libretto and choreography by Marius Petipa and music by Riccardo Drigo.

The Sérénade from the first act of the ballet became a popular repertory piece that has been arranged for various instruments and recorded on numerous occasions.

History 
Ivan Vsevolozhsky took up the directorship of the Imperial Hermitage Museum in 1899, a post that required supervision over performances given at the museum's theatre. Vsevolozhsky commissioned Marius Petipa—the renowned Premier maître de ballet of the Saint Petersburg Imperial Theatres—to begin work on three short ballets for the 1900–1901 season that would be performed privately before the imperial russian court. Petipa crafted the librettos for these ballets himself. The ballet were the one-act Les Ruses d'amour (The Pranks of Love), with a scenario inspired by french rococo; Les Saisons (The Seasons), a ballet-divertissement in one-act based on the four seasons; and Les Millions d'Arlequin, a two-act work based on the stock characters from the Italian Commedia dell'arte.

In the principal roles were Mathilde Kschessinskaya as Columbine, Georgy Kyaksht as Harlequin, Olga Preobrajenskaya as Pierrette, Sergei Lukianov as Pierrot, Enrico Cecchetti as Cassandre, Nikolai Aistov as Leandre, and Anna Urakova as the Good Fairy. The premiere was a private performance given before the Imperial Russian court that included the Emperor Nicholas II, the Empress Alexandra, and the Dowager Empress Maria. Private royal theatrical performances of that time were extremely formal affairs where rigid etiquette and protocol were strictly adhered to, and as such applause or cheering were not permitted. Nevertheless, within moments of the final curtain the typically subdued royal audience erupted into applause, with the ballet master Petipa and the cast receiving an enthusiastic ovation as they took their bows before the curtain. But much to the surprise of everyone present, the composer Drigo received such a reception after the performance that he was mobbed by several princes and Grand Dukes who tripped over one another in their enthusiasm to congratulate him for his music.

Les Millions d'Arlequin became a popular work in the repertory of the Imperial Ballet, with Marius Petipa's original production being performed consistently until shortly after the revolution.

Later productions
In 1933 the ballet master Fyodor Lopukhov staged Les Millions d'Arlequin as Arlekinada for the newly formed Maly Theatre Ballet of Leningrad. Lopukhov's version was a redacted version in one-act with costumes and décor designed by the artist Tatiana Bruni. The premiere on 6 June 1933 was the company's first performance as the Maly Theatre's official dance troupe. Lopukhov's production of Arlekinada was performed by the company until the 1990s, and was filmed on two occasions for Russian television. Lopukhov's version would go on to be staged by various companies and schools throughout Russia. 

In honor of the 65th anniversary of Les Millions d'Arlequin, George Balanchine created his own version of the ballet for the New York City Ballet as Harlequinade. This production premiered at the New York State Theater in New York City on 4 February 1965 with Patricia McBride as Columbine, Edward Villella as Harlequin, Suki Schorer as Pierrette and Deni Lamont as Pierrot. The New York City Ballet still perform Harlequinade to the present day.

Alexei Ratmansky's reconstruction

Marius Petipa's choreography for Les Millions d'Arlequin was recorded in the Stepanov method of choreographic notation not long after its premiere in 1900. Today, this notation is part of the Sergeyev Collection at Harvard University. In 2018, the choreographer Alexei Ratmansky utilized the notation of Les Millions d'Arlequin to stage a reconstruction of the Imperial Ballet's original production for American Ballet Theatre, with the designer Robert Perdziola creating décor and costumes based on the ballet's original production of 1900. Ratmansky's production was staged as Harlequinade and premiered on June 4, 2018 at the Metropolitan Opera House. The production was very successful and was later staged for the Australian Ballet in 2022.

Publication of the music
After the premiere of Les Millions d'Arlequin in 1900, plans were underway by the music publisher Zimmermann to issue Riccardo Drigo's score in both piano reduction and orchestral partition. Riccardo Drigo recounts in his memoirs of how his colleagues urged the composer to dedicate his score to the Empress Alexandra. This required the composer to submit a request for the dedication to the Minister of the Imperial Court, which brought about a lengthy correspondence by a commission set up to investigate whether or not the composer's character and background were worthy of his offering a dedication to a Russian Empress. In the end the response was favorable and the dedication was graciously accepted.

The "Sérénade" 

The first act of Les Millions d'Arlequin featured a scene where the character Columbine appears on the balcony of her house and is serenaded from the street by the character Harlequin with his prop mandolin (though a prop guitar was also used in subsequent performances). Drigo's music for this scene became popular in its own right and was published separately in arrangements for various instruments. The "Sérénade" would go on to become a staple of salon music during the Edwardian era and the inter-war period, and was even issued by music publishers under several alternate titles including "Valse Boston" or "Serenatina veneziana" ("Venetian Serenade"). The "Sérénade" was among the pieces in the White Star Line songbook, and was played by the Musicians of the RMS Titanic.

The "Sérénade" was later adapted into the song "Notturno d'amore" by the lyricist S. Focacci in 1922. The Italian tenor Beniamino Gigli made a worldwide hit with his recording of the song in 1926. "Notturno d'amore" would go on to be recorded by many notable singers, while various adaptations of the Sérénade have been recorded on countless occasions.

Gallery

References

External links

Ballets by Marius Petipa
Ballets by Riccardo Drigo
1900 ballet premieres
Ballets premiered at the Hermitage Theatre